Achille-Émile Othon Friesz (6 February 1879 – 10 January 1949), who later called himself Othon Friesz, a native of Le Havre, was a French artist of the Fauvist movement.

Biography
Othon Friesz was born in Le Havre, the son of a long line of shipbuilders and sea captains. He went to school in his native city. It was while he was at the Lycée that he met his lifelong friend Raoul Dufy. He and Dufy studied at the Le Havre School of Fine Arts in 1895-96 and then went to Paris together for further study. In Paris, Friesz met Henri Matisse, Albert Marquet, and Georges Rouault. Like them, he rebelled against the academic teaching of Bonnat and became a member of the Fauves, exhibiting with them in 1907. The following year, Friesz returned to Normandy and to a much more traditional style of painting, since he had discovered that his personal goals in painting were firmly rooted in the past. He opened his own studio in 1912 and taught until 1914 at which time he joined the army for the duration of the war. He resumed living in Paris in 1919 and remained there, except for brief trips to Toulon and the Jura Mountains, until his death in 1949.

During the last thirty years of his life, he painted in a style completely removed from that of his earlier colleagues and his contemporaries. Having abandoned the lively arabesques and brilliant colors of his Fauve years, Friesz returned to the more sober palette he had learned in Le Havre from his professor Charles Lhuillier and to an early admiration for Poussin, Chardin, and Corot. He painted in a manner that respected Cézanne's ideas of logical composition, simple tonality, solidity of volume, and distinct separation of planes. A faint baroque flavor adds vigor to his (most well-known) landscapes, still lifes, and figure paintings.

Othon Friesz died in Paris. He is buried in the Cimetière du Montparnasse in Paris. His pupils included the painter Marthe Rakine.

Paintings

Illustrations 
 Jean Cocteau, Bertrand Guégan (1892-1943); L'almanach de Cocagne pour l'an 1920-1922, Dédié aux vrais Gourmands Et aux Francs Buveurs

References

External links

 The Port of Anvers 1906

1879 births
1949 deaths
Artists from Le Havre
Fauvism
19th-century French painters
French male painters
20th-century French painters
20th-century French male artists
Modern painters
Burials at Montparnasse Cemetery
People of Montmartre
19th-century French male artists